Hugh Angus MacLellan II (born August 24, 1992) is an American rugby union player whose usual playing position is prop. He plays for the Utah Warriors in Major League Rugby (MLR) and has played for the United States national rugby union team.

Youth
MacLellan was born and raised in Michigan and attended St. Francis High School. During his high school years he played with the Traverse City Alliance team.

He played his college rugby with the Davenport University Panthers. At Davenport, he captained the rugby team and led them to a national D1-AA title. MacLellan was captain of the USA Collegiate All-American Team. He also played for Trinity University in Dublin, Ireland and Linwood Rugby Club in Christchurch New Zealand.

Professional and international
MacLellan signed with the Ohio Aviators of PRO Rugby in the spring of 2016, and was described as an emerging young player to watch.

MacLellan played two years with the U.S. under-20 national rugby team. MacLellan played with the USA Selects during the fall of 2014. MacLellan was named as part of the wider training group for the U.S. national team for the 2015 Rugby World Cup, but he tore his ACL, which eliminated his chances of making the U.S. roster.
MacLellan debuted for the U.S. national team on April 12, 2016 during the Americas Rugby Championship, and also played for the U.S. during the 2016 mid-year internationals.

References

American rugby union players
1992 births
Living people
Expatriate rugby union players in New Zealand
Utah Warriors players
People from Traverse City, Michigan
Sportspeople from Michigan
American expatriate rugby union players
American expatriate sportspeople in New Zealand
Davenport Panthers
Expatriate rugby union players in Ireland
American expatriate sportspeople in Ireland
Ohio Aviators players
United States international rugby union players
Sportspeople from Traverse City, Michigan
Rugby union props